Lakshmi Menon may refer to:

Lakshmi Menon (actress) (born 1996), Indian actress and dancer
Lakshmi Menon (model) (born 1981), Indian model
Lakshmi N. Menon (1899–1994), Indian politician and writer
Lakshmi U. Menon (born 1991), Malayalam television anchor and presenter